The Pilipinas Obstacle Sports Federation, Inc. (POSF; d.b.a. Obstacle Sports Pilipinas) is the governing body for the sport of obstacle racing in the Philippines. 

POSF is a member of the World OCR, the international body for obstacle racing, as well as the Asia OCR. It is also a recognized member of the Philippine Sports Commission and the Philippine Olympic Committee.

Incorporated on January 24, 2017 in Mandaluyong, Metro Manila, the Pilipinas Obstacle Sports Federation is based in Guadalupe Nuevo in Makati.

The POSF has organized the first edition of the Asian Obstacle Course Race (OCR) Championships in Aseana City in Pasay in January 2018 and hosted the first World OCR coaches certification program. It is set to host the inaugural edition of the World University OCR and the World Youth OCR at the Mall of Asia Arena. The sports body also plans to get obstacle racing introduce in the Southeast Asian Games and will lobby for the inclusion of obstacle racing as a regular or demonstration sports in the 2019 edition which the Philippines will host.

References

Obstacle racing in the Philippines
Obstacle racing
2017 establishments in the Philippines
Sports organizations established in 2017